Dwardius is an extinct genus of cardabiodontid sharks which existed during the Cretaceous period in what is now Australia, England, France, and India. It was described by Mikael Siverson in 1999, as a new genus for the species Cretalamna woodwardi, which had been described by J. Hermann in 1977. Another species, D. siversoni, was described from the middle Albian of northeastern France by V.I. Zhelezko in 2000; the species epithet honours the author of the genus. A new species, D. sudindicus, was described by Charlie J. Underwood, Anjali Goswami, G.V.R. Prasad, Omkar Verma, and John J. Flynn in 2011, from the Cretaceous Karai Formation of India.

Species
 Dwardius woodwardi (Hermann, 1977)
 Dwardius siversoni Zhelezko, 2000
 Dwardius sudindicus Underwood et al., 2011

References

External links
 Dwardius at the Paleobiology Database
 www.helsinki.fi
 skynet.be

Otodontidae
Fossil taxa described in 1999
Prehistoric fish of Australia